The Owen-Primm House was originally a log cabin built by Jabez Owen c. 1806, and later expanded with wood framing by Thomas Perkins Primm c. 1845. This property in Brentwood, Tennessee was listed on the National Register of Historic Places in 1988.

Dr. Jabez Owen was a prominent physician and planter in Brentwood who owned hundreds of acres around Moores Lane, Wilson Pike, and Concord Road. Dr. Owen was one of the wealthiest men in Williamson County, and at his death in 1850 he owned 58 slaves. Some of these antebellum slave cabins still stand on the property today.

It was built or has other significance in c.1806, c.1845, and c.1900.  It includes Central passage plan and other architecture.

The outbuildings include a pair of c.1845 log slave cabins with a shared stone chimney, square notching and original vertical board doors; a
c. 1920 stone springhouse, a frame barn with weatherboard siding from c.1920, a frame garage from c.1930; a frame shed from c.1930.

The property was covered in a 1988 study of Williamson County historical resources.

The Primm farm's former slave cabins were potentially to be preserved, but one plan failed in 2018.

References

Slave cabins and quarters in the United States
Houses completed in 1806
Houses on the National Register of Historic Places in Tennessee
Houses in Williamson County, Tennessee
Greek Revival houses in Tennessee
Central-passage houses in Tennessee
National Register of Historic Places in Williamson County, Tennessee